Antonio Ricci (1573–1637) was a Roman Catholic prelate who served as Bishop of Arezzo (1611–1637).

Biography
Antonio Ricci was born in Florence, Italy in 1573.
On 27 Jun 1611, he was appointed during the papacy of Pope Paul V as Bishop of Arezzo.
On 3 Jul 1611, he was consecrated bishop by Michelangelo Tonti, Bishop of Cesena, with Domenico Rivarola, Titular Archbishop of Nazareth, and Giovanni Canauli, Bishop of Fossombrone, serving as co-consecrators. 
He served as Bishop of Arezzo until his death on 20 Dec 1637.

Episcopal succession
While bishop, he was the principal co-consecrator of:
Gregorio Carbonelli, Titular Bishop of Diocaesarea in Palaestina (1611);
Roberto Roberti (bishop), Bishop of Tricarico (1612); and
Tiberio Muti, Bishop of Viterbo e Tuscania (1612).

References 

17th-century Italian Roman Catholic bishops
Bishops appointed by Pope Paul V
1573 births
1637 deaths